The High Inspectorate of Declaration and Audit of Assets and Conflicts of Interest (HIDAACI) is a government agency in Albania under the supervision of the Inspector General. The task of the agency is to administer the audit of the declaration of assets of public individuals.

References

Inspectorate
Financial system of Albania
Financial regulatory authorities of Albania